A chemical species is a chemical substance or ensemble composed of chemically identical molecular entities that can explore the same set of molecular energy levels on a characteristic or delineated time scale. These energy levels determine the way the chemical species will interact with others (engaging in chemical bonds, etc.). The species can be an atom, molecule, ion, or radical, and it has a specific chemical name and chemical formula. The term is also applied to a set of chemically identical atomic or molecular structural units in a solid array.

In supramolecular chemistry, chemical species are those supramolecular structures whose interactions and associations are brought about via intermolecular bonding and debonding actions, and function to form the basis of this branch of chemistry.

For instance:
 The chemical species argon is an atomic species of formula Ar;
 dioxygen and ozone  are different molecular species, of respective formulas O and O;
 chloride is an ionic species; its formula is Cl;
 nitrate is a molecular and ionic species; its formula is  NO;
 methyl is a molecular and radical species; its formula is CH;
 sodium chloride
 DNA is not a species: the name is generically applied to many molecules of different formulas (each DNA molecule is unique).

See also 
 List of particles

References 

Chemical substances